Edward Lawrence may refer to:

Politicians
 Edward A. Lawrence (1831–1883), American politician from New York
 Sir Edward Lawrence, 1st Baronet (died 1749), MP for Stockbridge
 Edward Lawrence (MP for Wareham) (c. 1594–1647), MP for Wareham
 Edward Lawrence (Rhode Island politician), see Joseph McNamara

Religious
 Edward Lawrence (minister) (1623–1695), English ejected minister
 Edward A. Lawrence Sr. (1808-1883), American Congregational pastor, professor, author 
 Edward A. Lawrence Jr. (1847-1893), American pastor; namesake of Lawrence House (Baltimore)

Others
 Edward Lawrence (athlete) (1896–?), Canadian middle-distance runner
 Edward Lawrence (customs collector), see List of Fellows of the Royal Society elected in 1708
 Edward Lawrence (footballer) for Belize Defence Force FC

See also
 Eddie Lawrence (1919–2014), American actor
 Eddie Lawrence (footballer) (born 1907), Welsh footballer